State Route 392 (SR 392) is a state highway and bypass around downtown Crossville in Cumberland County in the U.S. state of Tennessee.

Route description

SR 392 begins on the northwestern edge of downtown Crossville at an intersection with US 127/SR 28 (N Main Street). It goes southwest as an undivided 2-lane highway with a center turn lane to an intersection with US 70/SR 1 (West Avenue), where it widens to a 4-lane undivided highway and turns southeast, where it passes by several homes and businesses. SR 392 then narrows to 2-lanes after its short concurrency with SR 101 (Lantana Road), and continues southeast through some neighborhoods to another intersection with US 127/SR 28 (S Main Street). The highway then gains a center turn lane and curves northeast, passing through some more rural areas before coming to an end at an intersection with US 70/SR 1/SR 101 (Highway 70/Peavine Road), just south of SR 101's interchange with I-40 (Exit 322).

The entire route of SR 392 is known as Miller Avenue.

Junction list

References

392
Transportation in Cumberland County, Tennessee